Xanthippus (c. 525-475 BC) was a wealthy Athenian politician and general during the early part of the 5th century BC. His name means "Yellow Horse."  He was the son of Ariphron and father of Pericles. A marriage to Agariste, niece of Cleisthenes, linked Xanthippus with the Alcmaeonid clan, whose interests he often represented in government. He distinguished himself in the Athenian political arena, championing the aristocratic party. His rivalry with Themistocles led to his ostracism, but he was recalled from exile when the Persians invaded Greece. Xanthippus' actions in the ensuing Greco-Persian Wars contributed significantly to the victory of the Greeks and the subsequent ascendancy of the Athenian Empire.

Early political career and ostracism
As a citizen-soldier of Athens and a member of the aristocracy, Xanthippus most likely fought during the Battle of Marathon in 490 BC.  He first appears in the historical record the following year (489 BC), heading the prosecution of Miltiades the Younger, the general who had led the Athenians to victory at Marathon.  Miltiades had asked for a fleet of 70 ships and a supply of troops to be put at his disposal in reward for his victory, saying that he would not reveal his intentions, but that the venture would reap great profit for the city.  The Athenians granted his wish, but he met with set-backs during an attack on Paros and had to return empty handed and wounded.  Many Athenians suspected him of deceiving them.  The Alcmaeonidae were traditional political rivals of Miltiades' clan, the Philaidae, and they pressed for charges against the hero of Marathon, with Xanthippus making their case and asking for the death penalty.  Miltiades was in great pain due to his injury and could not defend himself, but his friends put up enough of a defence to avoid his execution; instead he was fined a sum too large to pay and thrown in prison as a debtor.  He died there of his wounds.  Athenians would come to regret their treatment of their war hero, but immediately following the trial Xanthippus had a brief interval as the pre-eminent politician of the day.

Xanthippus' leadership was short lived due to the rise of Themistocles, a populist set against the aristocracy that Xanthippus represented.  Xanthippus teamed up with his fellow aristocrat Aristides to counter the ambitions of Themistocles, but Themistocles out-maneuvered them with a series of ostracisms. These were basic referendums concerning the direction of the Athenian government, and reflected the new-found power  which the lower classes had gained under Themistocles. There were 5 prominent ostracisms of aristocrats during the political clashes of the 480's BC, and both Xanthippus and Aristides were among the victims.  Xanthippus was ostracised in 484 BC,  an action carrying a 10-year sentence of exile.

Return to Athens
The Persians returned to attack Greece in 480 BC, and Themistocles and Athens recalled both Xanthippus and Aristides to aid in the defence of the city.  The rival politicians settled their differences and prepared for war. The city of Athens had to be abandoned to protect its citizens and Plutarch relates a folk tale about Xanthippus' dog, who had been left behind by his master when the Athenians embarked for the safety of the Island of Salamis.  The dog was so loyal that it jumped into the sea and swam after Xanthippus' boat, managing to swim across to the isle, before dying of exhaustion.  In Plutarch's day there was still a place on Salamis called "the dog's grave."

Although not mentioned directly, it would seem that Xanthippus at least witnessed, if not fought in, the Battle of Salamis in 480 BC, which saved the Athenians and began to force back the Persian invaders.  Xanthippus was elected to the position of eponymous archon the following year (479/478 BC), showing the esteem in which he was then held.  At that time a large force of Persian infantry still remained in Greece and Athens was still under threat.  He also succeeded Themistocles as commander of the Athenian fleet that year, while Aristides was given command of the land forces.  (It remains unclear why Themistocles, after his brilliant victory at Salamis, did not retain his position.)

Battle of Mycale
Xanthippus' greatest military accomplishment was his command of the Athenian naval forces at the decisive Battle of Mycale against the Persians, which was fought off the coast of Lydia in Asia Minor under the command of Leotychidas of Sparta.  The remains of the Persian fleet that had survived the Battle of Salamis were stationed at the island of Samos.  When they discovered that they were being pursued by the Greek fleet they abandoned Samos and sailed to the opposite shore, under the slopes of Mount Mycale, where they beached their ships and retreated inland to set up a defensive fort.  The Greek forces launched an attack on them, with Xanthippus leading his Athenian contingent on the left flank (Greek generals fought on the front lines as an example for their men).  Xanthippus' men had easier terrain to cross than the other flank, so they engaged in combat with the Persians first and fought ferociously to earn all the credit.  They broke through the line and sent the Persian troops running to their fort for safety.  But the Athenians were able to breach the wall and when the other flank joined them they set to slaughtering the enemy.  After the rout, the Greeks, led by Xanthippus and Leotychidas, went back to the beach and set fire to the Persian ships effectively destroying the Persian fleet.  Herodotus claims this battle occurred on the same day as the Battle of Plataea, where Aristides led the Athenian contingent under the command of the Spartan Pausanias, and defeated the Persian land-forces.  With these two decisive battles the war was won and Athens was now safe.

Siege of Sestus
After the Battle of Mycale, the Spartans suggested that the defence of the Ionian colonies of Asia Minor should be abandoned, since it would be difficult to protect them from the nearby Persians.  Xanthippus, however, refused to consider the proposal.  Athens was the "mother city" of many of the Ionian colonies and she felt a deep kinship with them that demanded their common defence.  So the Greek fleet sailed to the Hellespont to destroy the Persian pontoon bridge there, but when they discovered it had already been destroyed, the Spartans withdrew and headed home, while Xanthippus led the remaining force on an assault upon Sestus in the Thracian Chersonese, which had been captured by the Persians and left under the charge of a Persian governor, Artayctes.  Sestus controlled the European side of the Hellespont and all the shipping trade that passed.  Since Athens was very dependent upon imported grain, this made trade with the Black Sea of strategic importance and Xanthippus was determined to bring these shipping lanes back under Athenian protection.   After a winter siege, Artayctes and his son attempted to escape, but they were captured.  Artayctes offered 200 talents to Xanthippus to spare his life - a huge sum.  But Xanthippus refused.  Artayctes' son was stoned to death in front of his father, and then Artayctes himself was crucified.  That Herodotus ends his account of the great war with Persia with this relatively minor affair has led some scholars to imply that the historian wished to end on a note that flattered Xanthippus' son, Pericles, who was one of Herodotus' patrons.

Legacy
Xanthippus returned to Athens a hero.  He died a few years later, but Pericles, his son, would go on to build upon the family glory, transforming Athens into the greatest centre of learning, art and architecture in Greece, while leading the city into battle against her rival, Sparta.

References

External links

5th-century BC Athenians
Alcmaeonidae
Ostracized Athenians
Eponymous archons
People of the Greco-Persian Wars